Corey Makelim is a United States international rugby league footballer who last played as a  for the Sheffield Eagles in the Betfred Championship.

Career
He was selected to represent the United States national team in the 2017 World Cup.
Makelim played for Australian side the Parramatta Eels at youth level. He then moved on to play for the Mount Pritchard Mounties and the Wentworthville Magpies from 2016 to 2017. In 2019 he helped the Eagles, by scoring a try, to win the inaugural 1895 Cup as they defeated Widnes Vikings 36–18 in the final.

2020
On 7 May 2020 it was reported that Corey would be leaving Sheffield Eagles to return to Australia due to his partner's homesickness

References

External links

Wentworthville profile
2017 RLWC profile

1994 births
Living people
Australian people of American descent
Australian rugby league players
Mount Pritchard Mounties players
Rugby league fullbacks
Sheffield Eagles players
Makelim
Wentworthville Magpies players